Hock may refer to:

Common meanings:
 Hock (wine), a type of wine
 Hock (anatomy), part of an animal's leg
 To leave an item with a pawnbroker

People:
 Hock (surname)
 Richard "Hock" Walsh (1948-1999), Canadian blues singer

Other uses:
 A type of wine bottle used primarily for German or Alsatian wine

See also
 Hock Mountain, a summit in Washington state
 Hocktide or Hock tide, an English holiday consisting of Hock Monday and Hock Tuesday